Ebrahim Forouzesh (persian: ابراهیم فروزش, born 1939, in Tehran) is an Iranian film director, and a former manager of the cinema department at the Institute for the Intellectual Development of Children and Young Adults (1971-1978) where he oversaw the production of many films, shorts, features and animations. He has collaborated with Ali Akbar Sadeghi and Abbas Kiarostami. His second movie The Jar (خمره) won the Golden Leopard for the best Movie at Locarno Film Festival.

Filmography 
 Kelid (the key), 1987, written by Abbas Kiarostami
 The Jar, 1992
 The Little Man, 2000
 Children of Petroleum, 2001
 Hamoon and Darya, 2008
 Zamani baraye doust dashtan, 2008
 First Stone, 2010
 Shir too Shir, 2012

See also
 Persian cinema
 Institute for the Intellectual Development of Children and Young Adults

References

Iranian film directors
Iranian screenwriters
Persian-language film directors
1939 births
Living people
People from Tehran